Pla Pak is a district (amphoe) in the province Nakhon Phanom in northeast Thailand.

Geography
Neighboring districts are (from the north clockwise): Mueang Nakhon Phanom, Renu Nakhon, Na Kae, and Wang Yang of Nakhon Phanom Province; and Phon Na Kaeo and Kusuman of Sakon Nakhon province.

History
The area of the district was at first a tambon of Mueang Nakhon Phanom district. On 16 June 1965 it became a minor district (king amphoe) consisting of the three tambons: Pla Pak, Nong Hi, and Ku Ta Kai. The first district officer was Winai Bunratnaplin. On 17 November 1971 it was upgraded to a full district.

Administration 
The district is divided into eight sub-districts (tambons), which are further subdivided into 85 villages (mubans). Pla Pak itself has township (thesaban tambon) status and covers part of tambon Pla Pak. There are a further eight tambon administrative organizations (TAO).

References

External links
Website Plapak website plapak.net
amphoe.com

Pla Pak